Tata Ronkholz (1940–1997) was a German photographer.

Ronkholz was born in 1940 in Krefeld, Germany. She studied at the School of Applied Arts in Krefeld and the Kunstakademie Düsseldorf. In Düsseldorf she was taught by Bernd Becher.

Her work is in the permanent collections of the Metropolitan Museum of Art, Museum of Fine Arts Houston, Die Photographische Sammlung/SK Stiftung Kultur the San Francisco Museum of Modern Art, and the Städel Museum, Frankfurt.

References

1940 births
1997 deaths
20th-century German photographers
20th-century German women artists
People from Krefeld
German women photographers